= Damascus International Book Fair =

The Damascus International Book Fair is a book fair in Damascus, Syria. It was first held in 1985. Its 2026 edition included books previously banned under President Bashar al-Assad. The guest of honor was the Kingdom of Saudi Arabia.
